Wynne W. Chin (born c. 1960) is C. T. Bauer Professor of Decision and information Sciences at the University of Houston (C. T. Bauer College of Business). Wynne is the second most cited researcher in his college and in the top ten in his university. He received his Ph.D. In Computers and Information System and an MBA from the University of Michigan, an MS in chemical and biomedical engineering from Northwestern University, and an AB in biophysics with a minor in philosophy from UC Berkeley. Before joining the University of Houston faculty in 1997, Wynne taught at the University of Calgary and Wayne State University. In addition, he holds visiting status at the School of Information Systems, Technology and Management at The Australian School of Business, UNSW.

Early life
Wynne Chin was born and raised San Francisco, California, where he collected vintage comic books. Chin owns Spider-Man issues 1 through 186.

Academic career
Chin's articles appeared in many high quality academic journals, including MIS Quarterly and Information Systems Research. His research interests include information technology diffusion, technology acceptance, structural equation modeling (SEM) methodologies, etc. Chin is widely considered a leading authority on SEM, especially partial least squares (PLS). He developed the first graphical-based software for PLS analyses in 1988 and credited with popularizing this statistical method in the 1990s. Wynne Chin is also considered an expert on reviewing academic articles and was recognized as the "reviewer of the year" by MIS Quarterly. He was awarded an AIS Fellow Award in 2013 recognizing individuals who have made outstanding contributions to the information systems discipline in terms of research, teaching and service.

Chin teaches a number of graduate and undergraduate classes, including philosophy of science, structural equation modeling, research methods, and related subjects.

In 2007 Chin was elected the president of the University of Houston Faculty Senate. He was reelected in 2015 receiving the distinction of being the only faculty ever serving as president twice. 

In 2011, Chin was appointed the sommelier of the Association for Information Systems.  He was charged with educating the palate of information systems professionals around the world.

He visits Sydney every year and provides intensive PLS training courses at the University of New South Wales.

Personal life
Wynne Chin is married and has two daughters named Christina and Angela. His hobbies include martial arts and wine tasting. Wynne is also an aspiring poker player and a grandmaster of hearts.

References

External links
 Dr. Chin's vita
 Useful SEM and PLS links
 

1960 births
Living people
Ross School of Business alumni
Wayne State University faculty
University of Houston alumni
Information systems researchers